Pacasmayo  is an airport serving the Pacific coastal town of Pacasmayo in the La Libertad Region of Peru.

See also

Transport in Peru
List of airports in Peru

References

External links
OpenStreetMap - Pacasmayo
OurAirports - Pacasmayo
SkyVector - Pacasmayo

Airports in Peru
Buildings and structures in La Libertad Region